David Greene may refer to:

David Greene (American football) (born 1982), American football quarterback
David Greene (director) (1921–2003), television director
David Greene (footballer) (born 1973), soccer player
David Greene (architect) (born 1937), English architect, lecturer and writer
David H. Greene (1913–2008), author 
Dai Greene (David Greene, born 1986), Welsh hurdler
David Greene (minister) (1797–1866), secretary of the American Board of Commissioners for Foreign Missions
David Greene (journalist) (born 1976), former co-host of NPR's Morning Edition
David Plunket Greene (1904–1941), one of the Bright Young Things who inspired the novel Vile Bodies by Evelyn Waugh
David Greene (rugby league) (born 1964), Australian rugby league player

See also
David Green (disambiguation)